Luc Ducalcon (born 2 January 1984) is a French rugby union player. Ducalcon, who is a tighthead prop, plays his club rugby for Racing Métro 92. He made his debut for France against Scotland on 7 February 2010.

Honours
 Racing 92
Top 14: 2015–16

References

External links
FFR profile 

1984 births
Living people
People from La Fère
French rugby union players
France international rugby union players
Rugby union props
Sportspeople from Aisne
Stade Rochelais players
Racing 92 players
Castres Olympique players
RC Narbonne players